Yonasani Kaijamurubi Rwakaikara (18 June 19181994) was a Ugandan Anglican bishop in the Anglican Church of Uganda.

Rwakaikara was born in Bugungu in Masindi District; educated at Clifton Theological College; and ordained both deacon and priest in 1966. He was consecrated a bishop on 10 April 1967 to serve as Assistant Bishop of Rwenzori. He remained assistant bishop until 25 June 1972, when he was installed diocesan Bishop of Rwenzori; he was translated to become Bishop of Bunyoro-Kitara, where he served from 1981 to 1989.

References

20th-century Anglican bishops in Uganda
Anglican bishops of Bunyoro-Kitara
1918 births
1994 deaths
People from Masindi District
Alumni of Clifton Theological College